"Lost in the Feeling" is a song written by Lewis Anderson, and recorded by American country music artist Conway Twitty.  It was released in May 1983 as the first single and title track from the album Lost in the Feeling.  The song reached #2 on the Billboard Hot Country Singles & Tracks chart.

A cover by Mark Chesnutt peaked at number 59 on the Billboard Hot Country Singles & Tracks chart in 2000 as a tribute to Twitty. Chesnutt also made a music video which featured clips of Twitty.

Chart performance

Conway Twitty

Year-end charts

Mark Chesnutt

References

1983 singles
Conway Twitty songs
Mark Chesnutt songs
Song recordings produced by Jimmy Bowen
Elektra Records singles
MCA Records singles
1983 songs
Songs written by Lewis Anderson